Overloaded: The Singles Collection is the first greatest hits album of British girl group Sugababes. It was released on 10 November 2006—almost one year following the departure of founding member Mutya Buena and the introduction of her replacement, Amelle Berrabah. Overloaded features twelve of the group's singles, four of which reached number one in the UK; "Freak like Me", "Round Round", "Hole in the Head", and "Push the Button". The Sugababes collaborated with members from Orson to produce two new tracks for the album, "Easy" and "Good to Be Gone". Overloaded received positive reviews from critics, who generally praised it as a reflection of the group's success.

The album peaked at number three on the UK Albums Chart and was certified Platinum by the British Phonographic Industry (BPI). By October 2008, it had sold 600,000 copies in the UK. Overloaded also reached the top twenty on the record charts of Ireland and Portugal, and the top forty on the charts in Austria, Denmark, Germany, the Netherlands, Norway and Switzerland. Its lead single "Easy" was released one week prior to the album's release, and reached the top ten on the singles charts of Slovakia and the United Kingdom. To promote Overloaded, the Sugababes performed at the 100 Club in London and embarked on the album's accompanying tour in the UK and Ireland from March to April 2007.

Background
Shortly following the release of the Sugababes' fourth studio album, Taller in More Ways, it was announced in December 2005 that founding group member Mutya Buena had left the band. Two singles were subsequently released from the album featuring new group member Amelle Berrabah, who was announced as Buena's replacement 24 hours after her departure. In June 2006, the Sugababes began working on their fifth studio album which was confirmed for release in 2007. However, group member Heidi Range also revealed that a greatest hits album would be released in time for Christmas 2006, which would include all of the group's hits. When rumours arose that the release of the album was premature, band member Keisha Buchanan stated that the group had already started to plan a greatest hits album. She explained how it was essential for the album to be released following Buena's departure, saying: "When Mutya left, we decided it was even more important, we should do this as closure so we don't have to relive history all the time." Group member Heidi Range also reflected upon this, saying: "When Mutya was still in the band the greatest hits was always planned for this time anyway. But when she left it seemed even more appropriate."

Release and content

Overloaded was released in the UK on 13 November 2006. In addition, a remix album titled Overloaded: The Remix Collection and a greatest hits DVD, Overloaded: The Videos Collection were released on the same day. Overloaded was not released in the United States, despite being reported that it would be available in the country on 5 December 2006. According to Dorian Lynskey of The Guardian, the group looks "positively regal" on the album cover. The album contains twelve of the group's previous singles, four of which reached number one in the UK: "Freak Like Me", "Round Round", "Hole in the Head" and "Push the Button".

The Sugababes collaborated with members from Orson to produce two brand new tracks for the album, "Easy" and "Good to Be Gone". Buchanan spoke upon the collaboration, saying: "When we started working with the Orson guys the sound just blew us away – it's so fresh, but has the same qualities as the biggest songs of our career. It's perfect for this album." Range, however, explained how she initially did not like the song in comparison to "Good to Be Gone". After leaving the studio, she called the other members of the group and spoke of her dissatisfaction with "Easy". Range realised she enjoyed the song after listening to it the following day, and later named it one of her favourite songs by the group. Despite being titled The Singles Collection, the album does not contain all of the group's previous singles; "New Year", "Soul Sound", "Angels with Dirty Faces" and "Follow Me Home" are omitted, although "Run for Cover" is included as a bonus track on the UK version. "Red Dress" was re-recorded to feature the vocals of Berrabah instead of Buena following the latter's departure from the group.

Reception

Critical response

Overloaded received positive reviews from critics, who praised the album as a reflection of the group's success. Andy Kellman of AllMusic rated the album four and a half stars out of five. He praised the tracks as "an ideal introduction" to the Sugababes, and noted that the new songs recorded with Berrabah "indicate that the group hasn't lost any of its momentum". Daily Record writer Rick Fulton gave the album a full five-star rating, saying: "Changing members can't dampen the winning formula of Sugababes – sassy vocals over electro beats". He concluded that Overloaded proves the group as the UK's best. Dorian Lynskey of The Guardian gave the album a four out of five star rating and wrote that the group's longevity "practically makes them the Status Quo of the genre".

The Herald Suns Cameron Adams noted that Overloaded is a reminder of "what a good pop act" the Sugababes are, although he was less favourable of the new tracks. Stuart McCaighy of This Is Fake DIY concluded that Overloaded is "awash with hits" and is indicative of why the group was named the most successful female act of the 21st century. Tim Fenney from Pitchfork Media rated Overloaded eight and a half out of ten; he praised the more emotional tracks on the album, writing: "While people may remember the group for their frothy pop, their greatest hits collection Overloaded is equally impressive for its devastatingly earnest balladry". Gigwise's Jenna Churchley-Burton described the album as "pure pop perfection at its very best".

Commercial performance
Overloaded became a commercial success in the UK. It debuted and peaked at number three on the UK Albums Chart, selling 57,284 copies in its first week of release, becoming the Sugababes' fourth consecutive top three album. The following week, it dropped to number eight on sales of 45,991. In its third week on the chart, Overloaded dropped seven places to number 15, although rebounded to number 11 in its fourth week on sales of 66,956. Overloaded was certified Platinum by the British Phonographic Industry, denoting shipments of 300,000 copies. By October 2007, the album had sold approximately 500,000 copies in the UK alone. In October 2008, Music Week confirmed that the album had sold close to 600,000 copies in the UK. Overloaded debuted and peaked at number 12 on the Irish Albums Chart 16 November 2006. It was later certified Platinum by the Irish Recorded Music Association, denoting shipments of 15,000 copies.

Overloaded also achieved commercial success in various other countries. It debuted on the Portuguese Albums Chart at number 28 and peaked at number 15 two weeks later, becoming the group's only record to chart in Portugal. The album entered the Norwegian Albums Chart at number 40 and reached number 21 two weeks later. Overloaded debuted at number 35 on the Austrian Albums Chart on 24 November 2006 and reached its peak position of number 25 on 8 December 2006. It spent nine weeks on the chart. The album debuted and peaked at number 29 on the Swiss Albums Chart and lasted nine weeks on the chart. Overloaded reached number 37 on the Dutch Mega Album Top 100 chart, number 38 on the German Albums Chart, and number 43 on the Belgium (Flanders) Ultratop chart. Overloaded peaked at number 34 on the Danish Albums Chart on 24 November 2006 and was certified Gold by the International Federation of the Phonographic Industry, indicating shipments of 20,000 copies.

Promotion

Singles
"Easy" was released on 6 November 2006 as the lead single from Overloaded, one week prior to the album's release. The song was written by Jason Pebworth and George Astasio in collaboration with the group's members—Buchanan, Range and Berrabah. It was produced by Pebworth, Astasio and Brio Taliaferro. This Is Fake DIY's Stuart McCaighy commended the song's production and seductive lyrics. "Easy" went top ten in Slovakia and the UK, and reached the top forty in almost every other country it charted in. "Good to Be Gone" was due to be released as the second and final single from the album in early 2007, although this was soon cancelled after the Sugababes collaborated with fellow girl group Girls Aloud on the Comic Relief single, "Walk This Way". The song went to number one in the UK.

Album launch and tour

The album launch for Overloaded was held on 3 October 2006 at the 100 Club on Oxford Street, London. The 80-minute show experienced a power cut and technicians were called to the scene, in which the performance resumed one hour later. Backed by a live band, every track featured on the album was performed (except "Good To Be Gone" and "Shape"). Betty Clarke of The Guardian gave the performance a three out of five star rating, describing them "as glossy as thoroughbreds, styled like Topshop mannequins", although acknowledging, "when the singing stops, the cracks appear". A journalist for MTV UK wrote, "Looking fab but not over-styled in skinny jeans, the girls still have the unpolished edge we love 'em for".

In November 2006, the Sugababes announced that they would embark on a tour in 2007 to promote Overloaded. The Greatest Hits Tour comprised 13 show dates in the UK and Ireland, starting from 27 March 2007 in Dublin Point, and ending at the London Wembley Arena on 13 April 2007, the latter of which was their first headline performance. Amongst the cities they visited included Manchester, Sheffield and Nottingham. The tour also featured a merchandise stall that sold T-shirts with the slogan "I'm the Next Sugababe". A journalist for Daily Mirror wrote: "From the still-brilliant 'Overload' to the tender 'Too Lost in You', the hits kept on coming as the crowd screeched louder with every song." During the tour, the Sugababes performed a cover version of "Rocks" by Scottish alternative rock band, Primal Scream.

Track listingNotes  includes vocals of Mutya Buena
  includes vocals of Amelle Berrabah
  includes vocals of Siobhan Donaghy

Digital and deluxe edition versionsOverloaded: The Videos Collection (DVD)Overloaded: The Remix Collection'' (Digital download)Deluxe edition''' (Digital download)

Personnel
Credits adapted from AllMusic.

George Astasio – producer
Dallas Austin – composer, drums, keyboards, producer
Goetz B. – mixing
Sophie Barber – violin
Dean Barratt –	programming
Fenella Barton – violin
Michael Bellina – producer
Simon Benson –	guitar (bass)
Amelle Berrabah – composer
Mark Berrow – violin
Rachel Bolt – viola
Thomas Bowes – violin
Andy Bradfield – mixing, producer
Bobby Bradley – bass
Keisha Buchanan – composer, vocals
Mutya Buena – composer, vocals
Martin Burgess – violin
George S. Clinton – composer
Nick Coler – composer, guitar, guitar (bass), programming
William Collins – composer
Miranda Cooper – composer
Nick Cooper – cello
Lisa Cowling – composer
Pete Craigie – engineer, producer, vocal engineer
Marcia Crayford – orchestra leader, violin
Dermot Crehan – violin
Caroline Dale – cello
David Jack Daniels – cello
Marius de Vries – bass, composer
Caroline Dearney – cello
Dario Dendi – engineer, vocal engineer
Manon Derome – violin
Siobhan Donaghy – composer
Rob Dougan – orchestral arrangements, piano, producer, string arrangements
Matt Duguid – programming
Philip Dukes – viola
Richard Edgeler – assistant, mixing assistant
Liz Edwards – violin
Chris Elliot – string arrangements
Chris Elliott – cello, piano
Tom Elmhirst – engineer, mixing, programming, vocal engineer
Guy Farley – string arrangements, string conductor
Simon Fischer – violin
Phil Fuldner – producer
Ben Georgiades – vocal engineer, vocal recording
Tim Grant – viola
Timothy Grant – viola
Jack Guy – engineer
Peter G. Hanson – violin
Doug Harms – assistant engineer
Brian Higgins – composer, guitar (bass), keyboards, producer, programming
Loren Hill – composer
Rebecca Hirsch – violin
Philippe Honore – violin
Lynda Houghton – double bass
Felix Howard – composer, guitar (rhythm)
Nick Ingman – conductor, orchestral arrangements, string arrangements
David Juritz – violin
Khris Kellow – vocal producer
Alison Kelly – violin
Kick Horns – horn
Patrick Kiernan – violin
Darrell Kok – violin
Boguslaw Kostecki – violin
Zoe Lake – viola
Peter Lale – viola
Patrick Lannigan – double bass
Tim "Rolf" Larcombe – keyboards, programming
Julian Leaper – violin
Shawn Lee – composer, guitar
Gaby Lester – violin
Anthony Lewis – cello
Peter Lockett – percussion
Mario Lucy – vocal engineer
Douglas Mackie – violin
Steve Mair – double bass
Graham Marsh – assistant engineer
Perry Mason – violin
Donald McVay – viola
Cameron McVey – composer, keyboards, producer, programming
Dominic Miller – composer
Steve Morris – violin
Everton Nelson – violin
Yoad Nevo – guitar, instrumentation, keyboards, producer, programming
Gary Numan – composer
Chris Parmenidis – mastering
Jason Pebworth – producer
PF – composer
Melissa Phelps – cello
Richard Phillips – keyboards
Karen Ann Poole – composer
Tim Powell – composer, keyboards, mixing, producer, programming
Jonathan Quarmby – producer
Heidi Range – composer, vocals
Tony Reyes – guitar, guitar (bass)
Nick Roberts – cello
Johnny Rockstar – bass, beats, composer, drums, keyboards, mixing, producer
Ian Rossiter – assistant engineer
Mike Ross-Trevor – string engineer
Niara Scarlett – composer
Frank Schaefer – cello
Mary Scully – double bass
Dominic Seldis – double bass
Jackie Shave – violin
Jon Shave – keyboards, vocals
Katherine Shave – violin
Celia Sheen – violin
Rick Sheppard – engineer, MIDI, MIDI design, sound design
Mark Sheridan – guitar
Paul Simm – composer, keyboards, producer
Simon Masterton Smith – violin
Zoe Smith – assistant, assistant engineer
Ralph de Souza – violin
Michael Stirling – cello
Sugababes – primary artist
Brio Taliaferro – producer
Chris Tombling – violin
Marc Valentine – composer
Diane Warren – composer, executive producer
Chris Watson – guitar
Ivo Jan van der Werff – viola
Jeremy Wheatley – mixing, producer, programming
Bruce White – viola
Richard Wilkinson – engineer
Jonathan Williams – cello
Steve "Syco Steve" Williams – double bass
David Woodcock – violin
Gavyn Wright – violin
Naomi Wright – cello
Richard X – producer
Warren Zielinski – violin

Charts

Weekly charts

Year-end charts

Certifications

Release history

References

2006 greatest hits albums
2006 live albums
2006 remix albums
2006 video albums
Albums produced by Cameron McVey
Albums produced by Dallas Austin
Albums produced by Richard X
Albums produced by Xenomania
Island Records compilation albums
Island Records live albums
Island Records remix albums
Island Records video albums
Music video compilation albums
Sugababes albums